Shirefie Coory (c.1865–18 March 1950) was a New Zealand businesswoman and matriarch. She was born in Bsharri, Lebanon on c.1865.

References

1865 births
1950 deaths
New Zealand women in business
Lebanese emigrants to New Zealand
New Zealand people of Lebanese descent
People from Bsharri